Philip Dadson (born 1946 in Napier, New Zealand)  is a New Zealand musician and artist, who was in the foundation group for the Scratch Orchestra and founder of From Scratch. He lectured at the Elam School of Fine Arts, part of the University of Auckland from 1977, leaving in 2001 to take up full-time art practice.

He co-authored the 2007 book Slap Tubes and other Plosive Aerophones with fellow instrument inventor Bart Hopkin, whose 1998 CD/book Gravikords, Whirlies & Pyrophones had also featured Dadson's group From Scratch.

In 2010 the Wellington Sculpture Trust commissioned Akau Tangi, a wind powered sculpture installed on Cobham Drive, Wellington. The eight poles, some partly submerged in the sea, are each topped with a rotating cone that produce a low level musical note. The rotating cones also have an internal light source powered by the wind driven rotating cones.

In 2015, a feature film documentary titled Sonicsfromscratch (dir. by Simon Ogston and Orlando Stewart), documenting Dadson's career, was premiered at the New Zealand International Film Festival.

Education 
Dadson is a Fine Arts graduate in sculpture from the Elam School of Fine Arts at the University of Auckland. He also obtained a Master of Arts with honours from Nepean, West Sydney University.

Awards and honours 
Dadson has received the following awards and honours

 2001 Arts Foundation Laureate
 2002-2003 New Zealand Antarctic Artist Fellowship
 2005 New Zealand Order of Merit for services to art
 2006 Fulbright-Wallace Arts Trust Award

References

External links 
sounz.org.nz
 Auckland War Memorial Museum, Ancient Worlds Gallery
 Pianoforté - Colloquium series at the Contemporary Art Annex
 cdemusic.org
 Radio NZ, Musical Chairs documentary, 8 November, 2003
New Zealand Arts Foundation Laureate Artist 2001
 New Zealand Order of Merit

1946 births
Elam Art School alumni
Musicians from Auckland
Living people
New Zealand songwriters
Male songwriters
Visual music artists
New Zealand contemporary artists
New Zealand experimental filmmakers
Experimental composers
Officers of the New Zealand Order of Merit
Inventors of musical instruments
New Zealand musical instrument makers
20th-century New Zealand artists
20th-century New Zealand male artists
21st-century New Zealand artists
21st-century New Zealand male artists
20th-century male musicians